The Oranje Nassau I was a Dutch coal mine located in Heerlen. The mine was in operation from 1899 until 1974.

The Oranje Nassau I was the oldest and second largest of the four Oranje Nassau Mijnen-mines. Close to the mine there were several coal washing plants and a large electric power station. The mine dominated the skyline of Heerlen with its two tall chimneys nicknamed "Lange Jan" and "Lange Lies".

External links
 http://citg.tudelft.nl/?id=18387 Coal Mining in the Netherlands (Delft University of Technology)

Coal mines in the Netherlands
Buildings and structures in Heerlen